Philadelphia Township is one of eleven townships in Cass County, Illinois, USA.  As of the 2020 census, its population was 208 and it contained 101 housing units.

Geography

Unincorporated towns
 Burlingame
 Old Princeton
 Philadelphia
(This list is based on USGS data and may include former settlements.)

Cemeteries
The township contains these nine cemeteries: Beard, Black, Centenary, Garner Chapel, Harding, Hopkins, John Robertson, McDonald and Page A Williams.

Major highways
  Illinois Route 125

Demographics
As of the 2020 census there were 208 people, 71 households, and 35 families residing in the township. The racial makeup of the township was 94.23% White, 0.96% African American, 0.48% Native American, 0.48% Asian, 0.00% Pacific Islander, 0.00% from other races, and 3.85% from two or more races. Hispanic or Latino of any race were 0.00% of the population.

There were 71 households, out of which 5.60% had children under the age of 18 living with them, 18.31% were married couples living together, none had a female householder with no spouse present, and 50.70% were non-families. 42.30% of all households were made up of individuals, and 42.30% had someone living alone who was 65 years of age or older. The average household size was 1.48 and the average family size was 1.83.

The township's age distribution consisted of 4.8% under the age of 18, none from 18 to 24, 14.3% from 25 to 44, 5.7% from 45 to 64, and 75.2% who were 65 years of age or older. The median age was 67.6 years. For every 100 females, there were 250.0 males. For every 100 females age 18 and over, there were 233.3 males.

The median income for a household in the township was $60,536, and the median income for a family was $122,569. The per capita income for the township was $39,585.

School districts
 A C Central Community Unit School District 262
 Virginia Community Unit School District 64

Political districts
 Illinois' 18th congressional district
 State House District 93
 State Senate District 47

References
 
 United States Census Bureau 2007 TIGER/Line Shapefiles
 United States National Atlas

External links
 City-Data.com
 Illinois State Archives

Townships in Cass County, Illinois
Townships in Illinois
1923 establishments in Illinois